Nadine Shahin, also known as Nadine Ayman Shahin and Nadine Ayman Mohamed Shahin (born 14 June 1997 in Cairo) is an Egyptian professional squash player. As of February 2020, she was ranked number 19 in the world.

References

1997 births
Living people
Egyptian female squash players
Competitors at the 2017 World Games
21st-century Egyptian women